Endowment tax is the taxation of financial endowments that are otherwise not taxed due to their charitable, educational, or religious mission. Endowments can be up to several billion dollars at some universities, some charitable foundations, and some medical foundations.

Endowment tax in the United States

Excise tax on private foundation endowments 
Unlike nonprofit corporations classified as a public charity, private foundations in the United States are generally subject to a 1% or 2% excise tax on any net investment income.

Federal changes in 2017 and 2018 
As enacted in the Tax Cuts and Jobs Act of 2017 and amended by the Bipartisan Budget Act of 2018, an excise tax of 1.4% on endowment income is levied on universities that have at least 500 tuition-paying students and net assets of at least $500,000 per student. The $500,000 is not adjusted for inflation, so the threshold is effectively lowered over time.

The endowment tax provision of the Tax Cuts and Jobs Act has been criticized as funding tax breaks for corporations and the wealthy at the expense of education. Critics note that the tax could threaten financial aid for low-income students, stifle social mobility, and prevent medical research. This tax only impacts the top 53 wealthiest schools, and is in line with what most other philanthropic charities pay in excise taxes. There continue to be vigorous efforts that advocate the repeal of the tax.

See also
 List of colleges and universities in the United States by endowment
 Payment in lieu of taxes

References

Taxes by type
Cambridge, Massachusetts
Taxation in the United States